Alligator Blood (foaled 19 September 2016) is a multiple Group 1 winning Australian bred thoroughbred racehorse.

Background

Bred by Australian entrepreneur Gerry Harvey, Alligator Blood was sold at the 2018 Magic Millions sale (Lot 22) for A$55,000 to the Ezybonds No 1 Syndicate.

Racing career

Alligator Blood's first Group 1 victory was in the 2020 Australian Guineas. 

In early 2022, Alligator Blood was banned from racing in the state of New South Wales.  Racing NSW stated this was due to the majority owner being an undischarged bankrupt and not meeting the standard for horse ownership in New South Wales. In August 2022, Alligator Blood was also banned from racing in the state of Victoria by integrity officials.

Alligator Blood returned to racing and convincingly won Queensland's premier racing event, the 2022 Group 1 Stradbroke Handicap.

Alligator Blood was first past the post in the 2020 Magic Millions Guineas, but was later disqualified after returning a positive swab to Altrenogest.

Pedigree

References 
 

Australian racehorses
Racehorses bred in Australia
Racehorses trained in Australia
2016 racehorse births